Marcelo Alejandro Penta (born 26 August 1985) is an Argentine footballer  who last played as a midfielder for Greek Gamma Ethniki club A.O. Ypato.

Career
Born in Las Heras, Mendoza, Penta began playing professional football for Newell's Old Boys in the Primera División Argentina. In order to have regular playing time, he went on loan to Chacarita Juniors in July 2007. He did not appear for the first team after returning to Newell's, and left for Greece in July 2009.

References

External links
Profile at epae.org
Profile at Futbol Passion

1985 births
Living people
Argentine footballers
Newell's Old Boys footballers
Tiro Federal footballers
Chacarita Juniors footballers
Pierikos F.C. players
Ethnikos Achna FC players
Volos N.F.C. players
Veria NFC players
Argentine Primera División players
Cypriot First Division players
Football League (Greece) players
Association football midfielders
Argentine expatriate footballers
Expatriate footballers in Greece
Expatriate footballers in Cyprus
Footballers from Rosario, Santa Fe